Cruis'n USA is an arcade racing game originally released in 1994. It was developed by Eugene Jarvis' company TV Games Inc., and manufactured  by Midway Games. It is the first game in the Cruis'n series and features races set in locations across the continental United States.

Cruis'n USA is branded as the first release of the "Ultra 64" platform collaboration between Midway and Nintendo, although it was based on the Midway V-unit arcade hardware, predating the Killer Instinct arcade hardware which would become the Nintendo 64. The home port was published by Nintendo as part of the deal.

The arcade version was critically and commercially successful, drawing favorable comparisons to Sega's Daytona USA. The Nintendo 64 version received poor reviews, but was also commercially successful. It was released on Wii's Virtual Console in Europe on March 28, 2008, making it the first third party developed Nintendo 64 game to be released on the service. It became available on the Virtual Console in North America on March 31, 2008.

Gameplay

Like in most racing games, players race down one-way courses consisting of streets vaguely based on real-life locations. While racing, they do their best to avoid various road hazards such as oncoming traffic and construction. Players chose between seven different cars, with either an automatic or manual transmission. The environments include Golden Gate Park, in San Francisco, to Washington DC.

In each race, players must reach first place to advance to the next track, and there is a time limit to reach the goal, which can be extended by driving through checkpoints. If the player does not finish before the timer reaches zero, the game ends, unless there is a continue available. Unlike most racing games, there is the option to change the music by pressing the music button.

Vehicles
The four vehicles featured in the game are generic vehicles based on their real life counter parts which consists of a 1963 Chevrolet Corvette labeled as a 1963 Muscle Car, a 1991 Ferrari Testarossa labeled as the Italia P69, a 1940 Ford V-8 De Luxe labeled as "La Bomba", and a Hyundai HCD-II Epoch labeled as "Devastator IV". Bonus cars consist of a 1991 Chevrolet Caprice police car, a school bus, and a Jeep Wrangler labeled as an All Terrain Vehicle.

Development

In early 1994, Nintendo signed a licensing agreement with WMS Industries, Midway's parent company, which allowed Midway to release two arcade games advertised as the first version of Ultra 64 hardware and formed a joint venture named "Williams/Nintendo" to port those two games to its consoles. Nintendo wanted an arcade racing game to compete against Sega's racing game Daytona USA and Namco's Ridge Racer, both of which were successful at the time. Eugene Jarvis, who had developed Defender (1981) and Robotron: 2084 (1982) for Williams Electronics, served as lead developer. Jarvis pitched a racing game concept to Williams and Nintendo. Along with Killer Instinct, created by Rare, the arcade original was showcased at the June 1994 Consumer Electronics Show as running on Ultra 64 branded arcade hardware, sharing the branding of Nintendo's upcoming home console, codenamed Ultra 64. A few months later, Nintendo of America chairman Howard Lincoln admitted that Cruisin' USA was actually programmed before the MIPS CPU based console version of Ultra 64 development tools were available from Silicon Graphics, and that even at this point Rare was the only development company to have access to these development tools. The Cruis'n USA cabinet shown at the Consumer Electronics Show was actually running on a modified JAMMA board. Cruis'n USA runs on a Midway V-Unit, which is very different from what would become the Silicon Graphics based Nintendo 64. The Midway V-unit consists of a 50 MHz TMS32031 CPU, a 10 MHz ADSP-2115 DSP for sound, and a custom 3D chip that can render perspective-correct but unfiltered quads at a high resolution (512 × 400 pixels).

Williams, the developers of the Nintendo 64 version, had to downgrade most of the arcade graphics to accommodate home console hardware. Originally announced as a Nintendo 64 launch game along with Killer Instinct, less than a month before launch day it was pulled from the lineup and returned to Williams for retooling because it did not meet Nintendo's quality standards. Several elements of the game, such as the ability to run over animals, and depictions of Bill and Hillary Clinton, were censored from the Nintendo 64 version. During the last couple of months of development, people sent letters or emails about the censorship. Jarvis also publicly objected to it: "It seems like they don't have a sense of humor. I don't know what's wrong with these people".

Reception

The arcade version of Cruis'n USA was critically and commercially successful. In the United States, RePlay reported Cruis'n USA to be the second most-popular deluxe arcade game in November 1994, and Play Meter listed the title to be the second most-popular arcade game in December 1994. It was one of America's top five best-selling arcade video games of 1994, receiving a Diamond Award from the American Amusement Machine Association (AMAA). It went on to be America's highest-grossing dedicated arcade cabinet of 1995.

Next Generation reviewed the arcade version of the game; while viewing the game as graphically less impressive than its rivals, they praised other aspects that could rival games like Out Run from Sega.

The Nintendo 64 version met with mostly negative reviews, and earned a GameRankings score of 50.63% based on 16 reviews. Reviews widely criticized the jerky frame rate, poor collision detection, and music, which they said to be both stylistically inappropriate and poorly composed. Next Generation  concluded that "this half-hearted, rough-shod conversion is exactly what Nintendo 64 doesn't need". GameSpots Jeff Gerstmann and GamePros Air Hendrix had more mixed reactions than most. Gerstmann praised the controls when using the Nintendo 64 controller's analog stick, but concluded the game to be a major disappointment. Air Hendrix, while heavily criticizing elements like the pop-up in the two-player mode and lack of variety in general, said it is essentially a faithful conversion of the arcade game and worth trying out as a rental, though not an outright purchase. Peer Schneider of IGN and Kraig Kujawa of Electronic Gaming Monthly both said the two-player split-screen mode is the highlight of the game, while noting that the frame rate problems are even worse in this mode. Kujawa's co-reviewer Dean Hager said the game "certainly fails to show off the processing power of the N64", and Shneider said it lacked excitement and was "probably doomed to be the nadir of N64 racing games for many years to come."

Despite the negative reviews, the Nintendo 64 version of Cruis'n USA saw strong sales, thanks largely to a combination of the console's popularity and the small library of games available for it at the time. It was the sixth best-selling video game of the 1996 Christmas shopping season according to TRST data, with three of the five higher-selling games also being Nintendo 64 games. By the end of 1997 it had sold over a million copies. In 1995, Flux magazine ranked the arcade version 63rd on its "Top 100 Video Games."

Reviewing the Virtual Console release in Nintendo Life, Damien McFerran echoed many of the original criticisms about jerky frame rate, poor collision detection, and lack of speed and excitement, and said that even the arcade original is a fairly poor game.

References

External links

1994 video games
Arcade video games
Assembly language software
Cruis'n
Midway video games
Multiplayer and single-player video games
Nintendo 64 games
Racing video games set in the United States
Video games set in Arizona
Video games set in California
Video games set in Chicago
Video games set in Indiana
Video games set in Los Angeles
Video games set in San Francisco
Video games set in Virginia
Video games set in Washington, D.C.
Video games set in the United States
Cultural depictions of Bill Clinton
Cultural depictions of Hillary Clinton
Virtual Console games
Video games with digitized sprites
Video games developed in the United States
Williams video games